The Royal Dutch Lawn Tennis Association (KNLTB) is the national governing body of tennis in the Netherlands. It was constituted in 1899 in Amsterdam by 15 Dutch tennis associations as the Dutch Lawn Tennis Association and received the description "royal" upon its 40th birthday.

See also
Netherlands Davis Cup team
Netherlands Fed Cup team

References

External links
Official website

Netherlands
Tennis
Tennis in the Netherlands
1899 establishments in the Netherlands
Organisations based in the Netherlands with royal patronage